Alpina Blitz is a steel roller coaster located at Nigloland in Dolancourt, France. It was manufactured by German manufacturer Mack Rides and opened on 12 April 2014.

Characteristics

Ride experience
Immediately after departing the station, the train begins to ascend the  lift hill. Following the main drop, the train makes a banked turn to the right before ascending into a twisting hill that passes underneath the lift hill. The train then travels into a straight hill before travelling through another banked right-hand turn. The train then travels over a series of small twisting hills before entering a banked left turn. Following this turn, the train travels over three small hills before turning left into the brake run.

Trains
Alpina Blitz uses two trains, each with four cars that seat four riders each; this allows a total of 16 riders per train.

Reception
Following the introduction of Alpina Blitz, Nigloland reported a 7% increase in attendance compared to the previous year.

References

Roller coasters in France